Jernail Hayes (born July 8, 1988) is an American sprint athlete. She was part of the USA team that won the silver medal at the 2012 IAAF World Indoor Championships.

References

External links
IAAF Profile

American female sprinters
1988 births
Living people
World Athletics Indoor Championships winners
World Athletics Indoor Championships medalists
21st-century American women